Vaalee is a 1999 Indian Tamil-language psychological romantic thriller film written and directed by S. J. Suryah in his directorial debut. The film stars Ajith Kumar in dual roles with Simran and Jyothika (in her Tamil debut). Vivek, Rajeev, Pandu and Sujitha appear in important supporting roles. A modern-day adaptation of the legend of Vali from the Ramayana, it revolves around Shiva and Deva, two identical twin brothers, with Deva being deaf-mute. When Shiva marries Priya, Deva becomes obsessed with and lusts for her.

Suryah completed the script of Vaalee in 60 days, and the project was picked up for production by S. S. Chakravarthy of NIC Arts. The soundtrack was composed by Deva and lyrics were written by Vairamuthu. The cinematography was handled by Jeeva while the editing was done by the duo of B. Lenin and V. T. Vijayan.

Vaalee was released on 30 April 1999 to positive reviews from critics. The film became a commercial success, running for over 270 days in theatres. Ajith won the Filmfare Award for Best Actor – Tamil and Jyothika won Best Female Debut – South at the same ceremony. The film was remade in Kannada in 2001 under the same title.

Plot 

Shiva and Deva are twins. Deva, the elder, is deaf-mute; but he is an expert at lip reading, and the head of a successful advertising company. Shiva loves and trusts his brother. Shiva falls in love with Priya, who wants to marry someone who is an ex-smoker, ex-drunkard, and got ditched by a girl but is pining for her. Learning this, Shiva, with the help of his friend Vicky, invents an old romance between him and a certain Sona, and wins Priya's love. But soon she realises Shiva's trick and breaks up with him. He tries to tell her that he only cheated and lied to her on the old romance but he loved her truly. One day, Priya comes to Shiva's house and slaps him, but eventually she reciprocates his love.

Meanwhile, Deva chances upon Priya and lusts for her. His obsession continues even after his brother marries the girl of his dreams, and he devises various means of getting close to Priya and keeping Shiva and her separated. Some of the methods Deva uses to woo Priya are masochistic (wounding his hand by the running car engine to stop the couple's wedding night) and psychotic (repeated attempts to murder his brother).

While Shiva is away on work as a substitute for his injured brother, Priya has to take care of Deva. Priya soon realises the intentions Deva has towards her, but Shiva refuses to believe her and has full faith in his brother. He even goes as far as to take Priya to a psychiatrist. To get away from it all, Shiva and Priya go on a long-delayed honeymoon, but Deva shows up there, too. Shiva watches Deva touching Priya's dress and kissing her photo and he realises that she was right all along. Deva beats up Shiva, packs him in a gunny bag, and throws him in a lorry.

Deva disguises himself as Shiva and tries to seduce Priya. Shiva calls her to tell that Deva is there but Deva picks the call. She thinks that Shiva told Deva where they are and the one in the phone is Deva's assistant Sudha who called her to tell that Deva might wounded his hand or leg to stop their honeymoon in the same way how he stopped their wedding night. She takes off the phone's wire so that he will not call them back. Shiva then goes faster to the home to save Priya from Deva.

Soon, Priya learns that he is Deva and escapes from him, then shoots him with a revolver. Deva falls into the pool unconscious, and when Shiva comes, she narrates the whole incident to him. He hugs and apologises to her for not believing her, taking her to the psychiatrist without knowing the truth and for trusting Deva without knowing his intentions towards her. Suddenly, Deva regains consciousness, but Shiva immediately kills him with the revolver. In the afterlife, Deva talks about his inability to express his feelings for Priya as he was mute.

Cast 
 Ajith Kumar as Shiva / Deva (dual role)
 Simran as Priya
 Jyothika as Sona / Meena
 Livingston (guest appearance)
 Vivek as Vicky
 Rajeev as Uma's husband
 Pandu as Velu Nair
 Rathan as Priya's father
 Balaji as Aadhimoolam, Vicky's patient
 Radhabhai as Shiva and Deva's grandmother
 Indhu as Uma
 Sujitha as Sheela
 N. Mathrubootham as the psychiatrist (uncredited)

Production

Development 
S. J. Suryah had worked as an assistant director in Vasanth's Aasai (1995) which featured Ajith Kumar as well as working with him during the making of Ullaasam (1997). Ajith asked Suryah to prepare a good script and promised he would give him a chance to make his directorial debut. After Suryah completed the script of Vaalee in 60 days, the pair approached S. S. Chakravarthy to produce the film. The film is a modern-day adaptation of the legend of Vali from the Ramayana.

Casting 
Keerthi Reddy was announced to be the lead actress in the film in December 1997, though she was replaced by Simran before filming began. Roja and Meena also were approached to play the female lead but both of them could not allocate the dates. Jyothika, sister of actress Nagma, made her Tamil debut in the film as an imaginary character, Sona. This is the first film where Ajith played two characters. Ajith mentioned that Vaalee "was very close to my heart and I gave it everything I had", adding that he had initially received widespread negative publicity and scepticism for doing a dual role too early in his career. Simran's voice was dubbed by Savitha Radhakrishnan.

Soundtrack 
The soundtrack was composed by Deva and lyrics were written by Vairamuthu. The song "Oh Sona" is based on "Susanna" by VOF de Kunst, and "Where Do I Begin?", the theme to Love Story composed by Francis Lai. "April Maathathil" took the beat of "Strange Kind of Woman" by Deep Purple.

Release 
Vaalee was released on 30 April 1999. The film became a huge commercial success, running for 270 days in theatres in Tamil Nadu, and 100 days in Kerala. It provided a major breakthrough for  Ajith, Simran and Jyothika's careers. The film was dubbed and released in Telugu in October 1999.

Reception 
Deccan Herald described Vaalee as "definitely worth seeing", saying it "has something for all tastes – a pleasant love angle, some suspense, complex psychological nuances, good acting, pleasing songs" while praising Ajith's performance. The reviewer from Indolink labelled the film as "a classic in its own right", praising the performances of Ajith and Simran while describing Suryah as "a new young director to the cine field who can make Tamil Cinema be proud once again". The New Indian Express labelled Simran's portrayal as "outstanding" while mentioning Suryah does a "fairly good job and succeeds". K. P. S. of Kalki appreciated Deva's music, the performances of Ajith and Simran, and Jeeva's cinematography, adding that Suryah's future as a director seemed bright.

Tamil magazine Ananda Vikatan dated 16 May 1999 appreciated the film by giving 45 marks and mentioned "Director SJ Suryah established his stamp of film-making in his very first film by taking up a straight line story with an engaging screenplay and realistic dialogues. Ajith Kumar has done a fantastic job in dual role and Simran also proved that she can act". K. N. Vijiyan of New Straits Times wrote, "It is amazing what fresh ideas new directors can come out with [...] Using a simple story, Suryah has come out with a winner". The Hindu wrote "Rich production values, fine performances by Ajit Kumar (playing the dual role of brothers) and Simran, bold and powerful dialogue by S. J. Surya, who has directed the movie based on his story and screenplay, are the major contributing factors in NIC Arts' "Vaalee"."

Accolades

Remakes 
Vaalee was remade in Kannada under the same title (2001). Boney Kapoor entered negotiations with Chakravarthy to acquire the remake rights for Hindi and other languages. In response, Suryah attempted to block Chakravarthy from selling the remake rights by filing a case to the Madras High Court, but his plea was rejected. Kapoor and Chakravarthy's deal was closed around July/August 2020. In November 2021, Suryah appealed to the Supreme Court of India, using a 2017 verdict by the Madras High Court that only the screenwriter holds the remake rights to his own film, but on 25 April 2022, the Supreme Court rejected his plea: "There can be no dispute that in respect of a cinematograph film, it is the producer of the film who is the owner of the copyright in the cinematograph film itself...Insofar as the copyright in the original story or the original screenplay or dialogue is concerned, to the extent the same is used in the film upon due consideration therefor being tendered by the producer, the producer is also deemed to be the owner of the copyright therein".

References

Bibliography

External links 
 

1990s psychological thriller films
1990s romantic thriller films
1990s Tamil-language films
1999 directorial debut films
1999 films
Films directed by S. J. Suryah
Films scored by Deva (composer)
Indian romantic thriller films
Tamil films remade in other languages
Tamil-language psychological thriller films
Twins in Indian films